James Blake was the defending champion but retired from tennis.

Seeds

Draw

Finals

Top half

Bottom half

References
 Main Draw
 Qualifying Draw

Sacramento Challenger - Singles
2013 Singles